Vigilante Season is the debut studio album by American rapper Max B. It was released on March 22, 2011, by Amalgam Digital. In 2008, the album was recorded and finished, after Max B left ByrdGang Records, after a falling out with founder and label-mate Jim Jones. The additional productions were handled by Dame Grease, Young Los and Whitey, among others.

Track listing

References 

2011 debut albums
Albums produced by Dame Grease
Hip hop albums by American artists
East Coast hip hop albums